Andrés Vilariño (born 28 September 1951 in San Sebastián) is a Spanish racing driver.

References

1951 births
Living people
Spanish racing drivers
24 Hours of Le Mans drivers
Sportspeople from San Sebastián
20th-century Spanish people